The Lonesome Death of Buck McCoy is an album by American rock band The Minus 5. Their final release of new material for Hollywood Records, it was released in 1997. The album was met with positive reception from critics.

Recording and release
The musicians making up The Minus 5 overlapped with the auxiliary touring members of R.E.M. and Tuatara; the musicians recorded The Lonesome Death of Buck McCoy alongside Mark Eitzel's West. The opportunity to record and tour with the material spurred Scott McCaughey to finish off songs that Peter Buck had started writing two years prior. The revolving door of performers supported all their releases (including Tuatara's Breaking the Ethers) with The Magnificent Seven Vs. the United States tour in 1997. This album was the first release from Hollywood Records imprint Malt Records.

Critical reception

The album has received positive reviews from critics, with Album of the Year characterizing consensus as a 90 out of 100, based on two reviews. The editorial staff of AllMusic Guide gave the album four out of five stars, with reviewer Stephen Thomas Erlewine writing that it was an improvement over their first full-length, Old Liquidator, with catchy songwriting and "charmingly ragged pop-rock". The review in No Depression concurred with the charming nature of the songwriting, tying it stylistically to 1960s pop music and concluding that McCaughey's first major label album is deserved. In Entertainment Weekly, Steven Mirkin compared the sound to Merseybeat acts and gave the album an A for "casually perfect crystalline pop".

Commercial performance
The album reached 58 on CMJ New Music Monthlys Alternative Radio Airplay in August 1997. In 2003, McCaughey claimed in an interview that the album had only sold 5,000 copies, compared to the greater commercial success of some of the musicians who played on the album.

Track listing
All songs written by Peter Buck and Scott McCaughey, except where noted:
"The Rest of the World" – 3:10
"Cross Every Line" – 4:01
"Empty Room" – 3:42
"Wasted Bandage" – 3:04
"Boeing Spacearium" (Buck, McCaughey, and Robert Pollard) – 3:27
"My Mummy's Dead" (John Lennon) – 2:30
"Moonshine Girl" – 3:20
"Popsycle Shoppe" – 2:47
"Wouldn't Want to Care" – 2:56
"Spidery Moon" – 2:42
"Bullfight" – 4:15
"Hate Me More" – 5:08

Personnel
The Minus 5
Jon Auer ("Admiral Boot")
Chris Ballew ("Mr. MacAfee")
Peter Buck ("Streetsinger") – guitar, associate production
John Crist ("Calliope Bird")
Dave Dederer ("Daughter")
Jason Finn ("The Constable")
John Keane ("Mr. Dawes, Jr.") – recording at John Keane's Studio
Barrett Martin ("Santouri")
Scott McCaughey ("Buck McCoy") – guitar, vocals, production, mixing, mastering, recording at LowBeat
Mike McCready ("Winthrop")
Christy McWilson ("Miss Polly")
Robert Pollard ("Ancient Roomer") – vocals on "Boeing Spacearium", recording in Dayton
Pony ("Nigel")
Ken Stringfellow ("Martha")

Additional personnel
Matt Bayles – engineering at Litho
Art Chantry – artwork
Ed Brooks – recording at Litho, mixing, executive production, associate production
Mark Downey – choreography
Rob Grenoble – recording at Water Music
Mark Guenther – mastering
Hammi Hammerschmidt – layout
Nadine McCaughey – artwork
Floyd Reitsma – assistant engineering
Jason Rowe – engineering at Ironwood
Todd Rundgren – recording at Location, Neverland
Robert Seidenberg – choreography
Kevin Suggs – recording at John & Stu's
Conrad Uno – recording at Egg
Kevin Wilson – painting

References

External links

The Lonesome Death of Buck McCoy at Rate Your Music

1997 albums
Hollywood Records albums
The Minus 5 albums
The Presidents of the United States of America (band)